Juan & Junior was a Spanish musical duo that was active between 1967 and 1969. Its members were the Spanish Juan Pardo (born in 1942) and the Filipino Antonio Morales "Junior" (1943–2014).

History 

Juan y Junior began their careers first as part of the band "Los Pekenikes" and later as part of "Los Brincos" in the 1960s. In February 1967 they formed the duo "Juan y Junior."

The band's discography was short (only 8 singles and one eponymous album), but it would not be fair to call the duo a "one hit wonder" as they had multiple hits.

Chart Performance:

Miscellania 

The song "A dos niñas" ("two girls") was created with Rocío Dúrcal and Marisol in mind. Later, Junior would marry Rocío Dúrcal, having together three children (Carmen , Antonio and Shaila ), before his death in April 2014.

In 1968 the duo was given the task of composing the entire soundtrack and musical themes for the film Solos los dos, directed by Luis Lucia Mingarro and starring Marisol and Palomo Linares .

The band parted ways in 1969 with each artist continuing as solo artists, as well as Junior's work as a producer.

On September 2, 2020, the band's music was featured on the shortwave radio service of Radio Exterior de España (REE).

Discography

Albums 
 Juan y Junior (1969).

Singles 
 La Caza / Nada (Novola, 1967)	
 A Dos Niñas / Tres Días (Novola, 1967)	
 Nos Falta Fe / Bajo El Sol (Novola, 1967)		
 Departamento De Radio (Novola, 1967)
 Anduriña / Para Verte Reír (Novola, 1968)		
 Tiempo De Amor / En San Juan (Novola, 1968)		
 Anduriña / To Girls (Zafiro, 1968)
 Lo Que El Viento Se Llevó / Tus Ojos (Novola, 1969)

 Filmography 
 En un mundo diferent , directed by Pedro Olea

References

 External links 

 Juan y Junior Biografía y crítica de discos en Lafonoteca.
 Los inicios de Juan y Junior en 1967, en Pop Thing.
 ¡Brincosis! Biografía, discografía, fotos y vídeos de Juan & Junior y Los BrincosThe first draft of this article was based on a translation of the Spanish Language wikipedia article on the same subject.''

Spanish musical duos
Spanish pop music groups